The 20th United States Congress was a meeting of the legislative branch of the United States federal government, consisting of the United States Senate and the United States House of Representatives. It met in Washington, D.C. from March 4, 1827, to March 4, 1829, during the third and fourth years of John Quincy Adams's presidency.  The apportionment of seats in the House of Representatives was based on the 1820 United States census. Both chambers had a Jacksonian majority.

Major events

 December 3, 1828: U.S. presidential election, 1828: Challenger Andrew Jackson beat incumbent John Quincy Adams and was elected President of the United States

Major legislation

 May 24, 1828: Tariff of Abominations, ch. 111,

Party summary
The count below identifies party affiliations at the beginning of the first session of this congress. Changes resulting from subsequent replacements are shown below in the "Changes in membership" section.

Senate

House of Representatives

Leadership

Senate 
 President: John C. Calhoun (J)
 President pro tempore: Samuel Smith (J)

House of Representatives 
 Speaker: Andrew Stevenson (J)

Members 
This list is arranged by chamber, then by state. Senators are listed by class and members of the House are listed by district.

Skip to House of Representatives, below

Senate 
Senators were elected by the state legislatures every two years, with one-third beginning new six-year terms with each Congress. Preceding the names in the list below are Senate class numbers, which indicate the cycle of their election. In this Congress, Class 1 meant their term began with this Congress, facing re-election in 1832; Class 2 meant their term ended with this Congress, facing re-election in 1828; and Class 3 meant their term began in the last Congress, facing re-election in 1830.

Alabama 
 2. William R. King (J)
 3. John McKinley (J)

Connecticut 
 1. Samuel A. Foot (NR)
 3. Calvin Willey (NR)

Delaware 
 1. Louis McLane (J)
 2. Henry M. Ridgely (J)

Georgia 
 2. Thomas W. Cobb (J), until November 7, 1828 
 Oliver H. Prince (J), from November 7, 1828
 3. John Macpherson Berrien (J)

Illinois 
 2. Jesse B. Thomas (NR)
 3. Elias K. Kane (J)

Indiana 
 1. James Noble (NR)
 3. William Hendricks (NR)

Kentucky 
 2. Richard M. Johnson (J)
 3. John Rowan (J)

Louisiana 
 2. Dominique J. Bouligny (NR)
 3. Josiah S. Johnston (NR)

Maine 
 1. Albion K. Parris (J), until August 26, 1828
 John Holmes (NR), from January 15, 1829
 2. John Chandler (J)

Maryland 
 1. Samuel Smith (J)
 3. Ezekiel F. Chambers (NR)

Massachusetts 
 1. Daniel Webster (NR), from June 8, 1827
 2. Nathaniel Silsbee (NR)

Mississippi 
 1. Powhatan Ellis (J)
 2. Thomas H. Williams (J)

Missouri 
 1. Thomas H. Benton (J)
 3. David Barton (NR)

New Hampshire 
 2. Samuel Bell (NR)
 3. Levi Woodbury (J)

New Jersey 
 1. Ephraim Bateman (NR), until January 12, 1829
 Mahlon Dickerson (J), from January 30, 1829
 2. Mahlon Dickerson (J), until January 30, 1829, vacant thereafter

New York 
 1. Martin Van Buren (J), until December 20, 1828
 Charles E. Dudley (J), from January 15, 1829
 3. Nathan Sanford (NR)

North Carolina 
 2. John Branch (J)
 3. Nathaniel Macon (J), until November 14, 1828
 James Iredell Jr. (J), from December 15, 1828

Ohio 
 1. Benjamin Ruggles (NR)
 3. William Henry Harrison (NR), until May 20, 1828
 Jacob Burnet (NR), from December 10, 1828

Pennsylvania 
 1. Isaac D. Barnard (J)
 3. William Marks (NR)

Rhode Island 
 1. Asher Robbins (NR)
 2. Nehemiah R. Knight (NR)

South Carolina 
 2. Robert Y. Hayne (J)
 3. William Smith (J)

Tennessee 
 1. John H. Eaton (J)
 2. Hugh Lawson White (J)

Vermont 
 1. Horatio Seymour (NR)
 3. Dudley Chase (NR)

Virginia 
 1. John Tyler (J)
 2. Littleton W. Tazewell (J)

House of Representatives 
The names of members of the House of Representatives are preceded by their district numbers.

Alabama 
 . Gabriel Moore (J)
 . John McKee (J)
 . George W. Owen (J)

Connecticut 
All representatives were elected statewide on a general ticket.
 . John Baldwin (NR)
 . Noyes Barber (NR)
 . Ralph I. Ingersoll (NR)
 . Orange Merwin (NR)
 . Elisha Phelps (NR)
 . David Plant (NR)

Delaware 
 . Kensey Johns Jr. (NR), from October 2, 1827

Georgia 
Two representatives replacing those who had resigned were elected statewide on a general ticket.
 . Edward F. Tattnall (J), until sometime in 1827
 George R. Gilmer (J), from October 1, 1827
 . John Forsyth (J), until November 7, 1827
 Richard Henry Wilde (J), from November 17, 1827
 . Wiley Thompson (J)
 . Wilson Lumpkin (J)
 . Charles E. Haynes (J)
 . Tomlinson Fort (J)
 . John Floyd (J)

Illinois 
 . Joseph Duncan (J)

Indiana 
 . Thomas H. Blake (NR)
 . Jonathan Jennings (NR)
 . Oliver H. Smith (J)

Kentucky 
 . Henry Daniel (J)
 . Thomas Metcalfe (NR), until June 1, 1828
 John Chambers (NR), from December 1, 1828
 . James Clark (NR)
 . Robert P. Letcher (NR)
 . Robert L. McHatton (J)
 . Joseph Lecompte (J)
 . Thomas P. Moore (J)
 . Richard A. Buckner (NR)
 . Charles A. Wickliffe (J)
 . Joel Yancey (J)
 . William S. Young (NR), until September 20, 1827
 John Calhoon (NR), November 5, 1827 – November 7, 1827
 Thomas Chilton (J), from December 22, 1827
 . Chittenden Lyon (J)

Louisiana 
 . Edward Livingston (J)
 . Henry H. Gurley (NR)
 . William L. Brent (NR)

Maine 
 . William Burleigh (NR), until July 2, 1827
 Rufus McIntire (J), from September 10, 1827
 . John Anderson (J)
 . Joseph F. Wingate (NR)
 . Peleg Sprague (NR)
 . James W. Ripley (J)
 . Jeremiah O'Brien (NR)
 . Samuel Butman (NR)

Maryland 
The 5th district was a plural district with two representatives.
 . Clement Dorsey (NR)
 . John C. Weems (J)
 . George C. Washington (NR)
 . Michael C. Sprigg (J)
 . John Barney (NR)
 . Peter Little (NR)
 . Levin Gale (J)
 . John L. Kerr (NR)
 . Ephraim K. Wilson (NR)

Massachusetts 
 . Daniel Webster (NR), until May 30, 1827
 Benjamin Gorham (NR), from July 23, 1827
 . Benjamin W. Crowninshield (NR)
 . John Varnum (NR)
 . Edward Everett (NR)
 . John Davis (NR)
 . John Locke (NR)
 . Samuel C. Allen (NR)
 . Isaac C. Bates (NR)
 . Henry W. Dwight (NR)
 . John Bailey (NR)
 . Joseph Richardson (NR)
 . James L. Hodges (NR)
 . John Reed Jr. (NR)

Mississippi 
 . William Haile (J), until September 12, 1828
 Thomas Hinds (J), from October 21, 1828

Missouri 
 . Edward Bates (NR)

New Hampshire 
All representatives were elected statewide on a general ticket.
 . David Barker Jr. (NR)
 . Ichabod Bartlett (NR)
 . Titus Brown (NR)
 . Jonathan Harvey (J)
 . Joseph Healy (NR)
 . Thomas Whipple Jr. (NR)

New Jersey 
All representatives were elected statewide on a general ticket.
 . Lewis Condict (NR)
 . George Holcombe (J), until January 14, 1828
 James F. Randolph (NR), from December 1, 1828
 . Isaac Pierson (NR)
 . Samuel Swan (NR)
 . Hedge Thompson (NR), until July 23, 1828
 Thomas Sinnickson (NR), from December 1, 1828
 . Ebenezer Tucker (NR)

New York 
There were three plural districts: the 20th & 26th had two representatives each, and the 3rd had three representatives.
 . Silas Wood (NR)
 . John J. Wood (J)
 . Churchill C. Cambreleng (J)
 . Jeromus Johnson (J)
 . Gulian C. Verplanck (J)
 . Aaron Ward (NR)
 . Thomas J. Oakley (J), until May 9, 1828
 Thomas Taber II (J), from November 5, 1828
 . John Hallock Jr. (J)
 . George O. Belden (J)
 . James Strong (NR)
 . John D. Dickinson (NR)
 . Stephen Van Rensselaer (NR)
 . Selah R. Hobbie (J)
 . John I. De Graff (J)
 . Samuel Chase (NR)
 . Henry R. Storrs (NR)
 . Michael Hoffman (J)
 . Henry Markell (NR)
 . John W. Taylor (NR)
 . Henry C. Martindale (NR)
 . Richard Keese (J)
 . Rudolph Bunner (J)
 . Silas Wright Jr. (J), until February 16, 1829, vacant thereafter
 . John C. Clark (J)
 . John G. Stower (J)
 . Jonas Earll Jr. (J)
 . Nathaniel Garrow (J)
 . David Woodcock (NR)
 . Dudley Marvin (NR)
 . John Maynard (NR)
 . Daniel D. Barnard (NR)
 . John Magee (J)
 . David E. Evans (J), until May 2, 1827
 Phineas L. Tracy (NR), from November 5, 1827
 . Daniel G. Garnsey (J)

North Carolina 
 . Lemuel Sawyer (J)
 . Willis Alston (J)
 . Thomas H. Hall (J)
 . John H. Bryan (NR)
 . Gabriel Holmes (J)
 . Daniel Turner (J)
 . John Culpepper (NR)
 . Daniel L. Barringer (J)
 . Augustine H. Shepperd (J)
 . John Long (NR)
 . Henry W. Connor (J)
 . Samuel P. Carson (J)
 . Lewis Williams (NR)

Ohio 
 . James Findlay (J)
 . John Woods (NR)
 . William McLean (NR)
 . Joseph Vance (NR)
 . William Russell (J)
 . William Creighton Jr. (NR), until sometime in 1828
 Francis S. Muhlenberg (NR), from December 19, 1828
 . Samuel F. Vinton (NR)
 . William Wilson (NR), until June 6, 1827
 William Stanbery (J), from October 9, 1827
 . Philemon Beecher (NR)
 . John Davenport (NR)
 . John C. Wright (NR)
 . John Sloane (NR)
 . Elisha Whittlesey (NR)
 . Mordecai Bartley (NR)

Pennsylvania 
There were six plural districts: the 7th, 8th, 11th & 16th had two representatives each, and the 4th & 9th had three representatives each.
 . Joel B. Sutherland (J)
 . John Sergeant (NR)
 . Daniel H. Miller (J)
 . Samuel Anderson (NR)
 . James Buchanan (J)
 . Charles Miner (NR)
 . John B. Sterigere (J)
 . Innis Green (J)
 . William Addams (J)
 . Joseph Fry Jr. (J)
 . Samuel D. Ingham (J)
 . George Wolf (J)
 . George Kremer (J)
 . Samuel McKean (J)
 . Espy Van Horne (J)
 . Adam King (J)
 . William Ramsey (J)
 . James Wilson (NR)
 . John Mitchell (J)
 . Chauncey Forward (J)
 . Andrew Stewart (NR)
 . Joseph Lawrence (NR)
 . Robert Orr Jr. (J)
 . James S. Stevenson (J)
 . Richard Coulter (J)
 . Stephen Barlow (J)

Rhode Island 
Both representatives were elected statewide on a general ticket.
 . Tristam Burges (NR)
 . Dutee J. Pearce (NR)

South Carolina 
 . William Drayton (J)
 . James Hamilton Jr. (J)
 . Thomas R. Mitchell (J)
 . William D. Martin (J)
 . George McDuffie (J)
 . Warren R. Davis (J)
 . William T. Nuckolls (J)
 . John Carter (J)
 . Starling Tucker (J)

Tennessee 
 . John Blair (J)
 . Pryor Lea (J)
 . James C. Mitchell (J)
 . Jacob C. Isacks (J)
 . Robert Desha (J)
 . James K. Polk (J)
 . John Bell (J)
 . John H. Marable (J)
 . Davy Crockett (J)

Vermont 
 . Jonathan Hunt (NR)
 . Rollin C. Mallary (NR)
 . George E. Wales (NR)
 . Benjamin Swift (NR)
 . Daniel A. A. Buck (NR)

Virginia 
 . Thomas Newton Jr. (NR)
 . James Trezvant (J)
 . William S. Archer (J)
 . Mark Alexander (J)
 . John Randolph (J)
 . Thomas Davenport (J)
 . Nathaniel H. Claiborne (J)
 . Burwell Bassett (J)
 . Andrew Stevenson (J)
 . William C. Rives (J)
 . Philip P. Barbour (J)
 . John Roane (J)
 . John Taliaferro (NR)
 . Charles F. Mercer (NR)
 . John S. Barbour (J)
 . William Armstrong (NR)
 . Robert Allen (J)
 . Isaac Leffler (NR)
 . William McCoy (J)
 . John Floyd (J)
 . Lewis Maxwell (NR)
 . Alexander Smyth (J)

Non-voting members 
 . Henry W. Conway, until November 9, 1827
 Ambrose H. Sevier, from February 13, 1828
 . Joseph M. White
 . Austin E. Wing (NR)

Changes in membership
The count below reflects changes from the beginning of the first session of this Congress.

Senate 
 Replacements: 6
National Republican (NR): no net change
Jacksonian (J): no net change
 Deaths: 0
 Resignations: 7
 Interim appointments: 0
Total seats with changes: 8

|-
| Massachusetts(1)
| Vacant
| style="font-size:80%" | Seat remained vacant because legislature had failed to elect.Winner was elected June 8, 1827.
|  | Daniel Webster (NR)
| Installed December 17, 1827
|-
| Ohio(3)
|  | William Henry Harrison (NR)
| style="font-size:80%" | Resigned May 20, 1828, to become U.S. Minister Plenipotentiary to Gran Colombia.A special election was held December 10, 1828.
|  | Jacob Burnet (NR)
| Installed December 10, 1828
|-
| Maine(1)
|  | Albion K. Parris (J)
| style="font-size:80%" | Resigned August 26, 1828, after being appointed to the Maine Supreme Judicial Court.A special election was held January 15, 1829.
|  | John Holmes (NR)
| Installed January 15, 1829
|-
| Georgia(2)
|  | Thomas W. Cobb (J)
| style="font-size:80%" | Resigned before November 7, 1828.A special election was held November 7, 1828.
|  | Oliver H. Prince (J)
| Installed November 7, 1828
|-
| North Carolina(3)
|  | Nathaniel Macon (J)
| style="font-size:80%" | Resigned November 14, 1828.A special election was held December 15, 1828.
|  | James Iredell Jr. (J)
| Installed December 15, 1828
|-
| New York(1)
|  | Martin Van Buren (J)
| style="font-size:80%" | Resigned December 20, 1828, to become Governor of New York.A special election was held January 15, 1829.
|  | Charles E. Dudley (J)
| Installed January 15, 1829
|-
| New Jersey(1)
|  | Ephraim Bateman (NR)
| style="font-size:80%" | Resigned January 12, 1829, due to failing health.A special election was held January 30, 1829.
|  | Mahlon Dickerson (J)
| Installed January 30, 1829
|-
| New Jersey(2)
|  | Mahlon Dickerson (J)
| style="font-size:80%" | Resigned January 30, 1829, after being elected to New Jersey's Class 1 U.S. Senate seat.
| Vacant
| Not filled in this Congress
|}

House of Representatives 
 Replacements: 9
National Republican (NR): 1-seat net loss
Jacksonian (J): 1-seat net gain
 Deaths: 5
 Resignations: 9
 Contested election: 1
Total seats with changes: 15

|-
| 
|  | Edward F. Tattnall (J)
| Resigned some time in 1827 before the assembling of Congress
|  | George R. Gilmer (J)
| Seated October 1, 1827

|-
| 
| Vacant
| Louis McLane (J) resigned despite winning reelection in 1826 after being elected to the US Senate.
|  | Kensey Johns Jr. (NR)
| Seated October 2, 1827

|-
| 
|  | David E. Evans (J)
| Resigned May 2, 1827
|  | Phineas L. Tracy (NR)
| Seated November 5, 1827

|-
| 
|  | Daniel Webster (NR)
| Resigned May 30, 1827, to run for the US Senate
|  | Benjamin Gorham (NR)
| Seated July 23, 1827

|-
| 
|  | William Wilson (NR)
| Died June 6, 1827
|  | William Stanbery (J)
| Seated October 9, 1827

|-
| 
|  | William Burleigh (NR)
| Died July 2, 1827
|  | Rufus McIntire (J)
| Seated September 10, 1827

|-
| 
|  | William S. Young (NR)
| Died September 20, 1827
|  | John Calhoon (NR)
| Seated November 5, 1827

|-
| 
|  | John Calhoon (NR)
| Resigned November 7, 1827, to avoid an election dispute
|  | Thomas Chilton (J)
| Seated December 22, 1827

|-
| 
|  | John Forsyth (J)
| Resigned November 7, 1827, after being elected Governor of Georgia
|  | Richard H. Wilde (J)
| Seated November 17, 1827

|-
| 
| Henry W. Conway
| Died November 9, 1827
| Ambrose H. Sevier
| Seated February 13, 1828

|-
| 
|  | George Holcombe (J)
| Died January 14, 1828
|  | James F. Randolph (NR)
| Seated December 1, 1828

|-
| 
|  | Thomas J. Oakley (J)
| Resigned May 9, 1828, after being appointed judge of the Superior Court of New York City
|  | Thomas Taber II (J)
| Seated November 5, 1828

|-
| 
|  | Thomas Metcalfe (NR)
| Resigned June 1, 1828, after being elected Governor of Kentucky
|  | John Chambers (NR)
| Seated December 1, 1828

|-
| 
|  | Hedge Thompson (NR)
| Died July 23, 1828
|  | Thomas Sinnickson (NR)
| Seated December 1, 1828

|-
| 
|  | William Haile (J)
| Resigned September 12, 1828
|  | Thomas Hinds (J)
| Seated October 21, 1828

|-
| 
|  | William Creighton Jr. (NR)
| Resigned before December 19, 1828, after being nominated as a judge to district court
|  | Francis S. Muhlenberg (NR)
| Seated December 19, 1828

|-
| 
|  | Silas Wright (J)
| Resigned February 16, 1829
| Vacant
| Not filled this Congress

|}

Committees
Lists of committees and their party leaders.

Senate

 Agriculture (Chairman: John Branch)
 Alabama Land Purchase (Select)
 Audit and Control the Contingent Expenses of the Senate (Chairman: Elias Kane)
 Claims (Chairman: Benjamin Ruggles)
 Commerce (Chairman: Levi Woodbury)
 Debt Imprisonment Abolition (Select)
 Distributing Public Revenue Among the States (Select)
 District of Columbia (Chairman: John Eaton)
 Engrossed Bills (Chairman: William Marks)
 Finance (Chairman: Samuel Smith) 
 Foreign Relations (Chairman: Nathaniel Macon then Littleton Tazewell)
 French Spoilations (Select)
 Indian Affairs (Chairman: Thomas Hart Benton then Hugh Lawson White)
 Judiciary (Chairman: Martin Van Buren then John M. Berrien) 
 Manufactures (Chairman: Samuel Smith)
 Military Affairs (Chairman: William Henry Harrison then Thomas Hart Benton)
 Militia (Chairman: John Chandler)
 Naval Affairs (Chairman: Robert Y. Hayne)
 Pensions (Chairman: James Noble)
 Post Office and Post Roads (Chairman: Richard M. Johnson)
 Private Land Claims (Chairman: William Smith) 
 Public Lands (Chairman: David Barton)
 Revolutionary Officers (Select)
 Roads and Canals (Select) (Chairman: William Hendricks)
 Tariff Regulation (Select)
 Vaccination (Select)
 Whole

House of Representatives

 Accounts (Chairman: Samuel C. Allen)
 Agriculture (Chairman: Stephen Van Rensselaer)
 Assault on the President's Secretary (Select)
 American Colonization Society (Select)
 Claims (Chairman: Lewis Williams)
 Commerce (Chairman: Churchill C. Cambreleng)
 District of Columbia (Chairman: Mark Alexander)
 Elections (Chairman: John Sloane) 
 Ethics (Chairman: N/A)
 Expenditures in the Navy Department (Chairman: Peter Little)
 Expenditures in the Post Office Department (Chairman: Gabriel Holmes)
 Expenditures in the State Department (Chairman: John Blair)
 Expenditures in the Treasury Department (Chairman: Thomas H. Hall)
 Expenditures in the War Department (Chairman: Charles Eaton Haynes)
 Expenditures on Public Buildings (Chairman: Michael C. Sprigg)
 Foreign Affairs (Chairman: Edward Everett)
 Indian Affairs (Chairman: William McLean)
 Judiciary (Chairman: Philip P. Barbour)
 Manufactures (Chairman: Rollin C. Mallary)
 Military Affairs (Chairman: James Hamilton Jr.)
 Military Pensions (Chairman: Tristam Burges)
 Naval Affairs (Chairman: Michael Hoffman)
 Post Office and Post Roads (Chairman: Samuel D. Ingham then Samuel McKean) 
 Private Land Claims (Chairman: Richard Aylett Buckner)
 Public Expenditures (Chairman: Jeromus Johnson)
 Public Lands (Chairman: Jacob C. Isacks)
 Revisal and Unfinished Business (Chairman: Dutee J. Pearce)
 Revolutionary Claims (Chairman: George Wolf)
 Rules (Select)
 Standards of Official Conduct
 Territories (Chairman: James Strong)
 Ways and Means (Chairman: George McDuffie)
 Whole

Joint committees

 Enrolled Bills
 The Library 
 To Prepare a Code of Laws for the District of Columbia

Employees

Legislative branch agency directors 
 Architect of the Capitol: Charles Bulfinch
 Librarian of Congress: George Watterston

Senate 
 Chaplain: William Ryland (Methodist)
 Secretary: Walter Lowrie
 Sergeant at Arms: Mountjoy Bayly

House of Representatives 
 Chaplain: Reuben Post (Presbyterian)
 Clerk: Matthew St. Clair Clarke
 Doorkeeper: Benjamin Birch
 Reading Clerks: 
 Sergeant at Arms: John O. Dunn

See also 
 1826 United States elections (elections leading to this Congress)
 1826–27 United States Senate elections
 1826–27 United States House of Representatives elections
 1828 United States elections (elections during this Congress, leading to the next Congress)
 1828 United States presidential election
 1828–29 United States Senate elections
 1828–29 United States House of Representatives elections

Notes

References

External links
Statutes at Large, 1789-1875
Senate Journal, First Forty-three Sessions of Congress
House Journal, First Forty-three Sessions of Congress
Biographical Directory of the U.S. Congress
U.S. House of Representatives: House History
U.S. Senate: Statistics and Lists